For the 1984 Vuelta a España, the field consisted of 130 riders; 97 finished the race.

By rider

By nationality

References

1984 Vuelta a España
1984